John Albert Pelling (born 27 May 1936) is a British fencer.

Fencing career
He won a silver medal in the team épée event at the 1960 Summer Olympics.

He represented England and won a gold medal and silver medal in the épée events at the 1962 British Empire and Commonwealth Games in Perth, Western Australia. Four years later he repeated the success at the 1966 British Empire and Commonwealth Games in Kingston, Jamaica.

He was a twice British fencing champion, winning the épée title at the British Fencing Championships in 1961 and 1965.

References

1936 births
Living people
British male fencers
Olympic fencers of Great Britain
Fencers at the 1960 Summer Olympics
Fencers at the 1964 Summer Olympics
Olympic silver medallists for Great Britain
Olympic medalists in fencing
Sportspeople from London
Medalists at the 1960 Summer Olympics
Commonwealth Games medallists in fencing
Commonwealth Games gold medallists for England
Commonwealth Games silver medallists for England
Fencers at the 1962 British Empire and Commonwealth Games
Fencers at the 1966 British Empire and Commonwealth Games
English Olympic medallists
Medallists at the 1962 British Empire and Commonwealth Games
Medallists at the 1966 British Empire and Commonwealth Games